Wearmouth railway station served the area of Monkwearmouth, Tyne and Wear, England, from 1839 to 1848 on the Brandling Junction Railway.

History
The station was opened on 19 June 1839 by the Brandling Junction Railway. It was known as Monkwearmouth in the notice and the newspapers. It closed on 19 June 1848, being replaced by  station.

References

Disused railway stations in Tyne and Wear
Railway stations in Great Britain opened in 1839
Railway stations in Great Britain closed in 1848
1839 establishments in England
1848 disestablishments in England